Jung Seul-ki (also Jeong Seul-gi, ; born July 13, 1988) is a South Korean swimmer, who specialized in breaststroke events. She finished eleventh in the women's 200 m breaststroke at the 2008 Summer Olympics, and has won a career total of four medals (one gold and three bronze) in a major international competition, spanning the 2006 Pan Pacific Championships, the 2006 Asian Games, and the 2007 Summer Universiade. Jung also served as a varsity member of the swimming team at Yonsei University.

Jung made her first South Korean team at the 2006 Asian Games in Doha, Qatar. There, she won two bronze medals each in the 200 m breaststroke, and as a member of the nation's swimming team in the 4×100 m medley. Jung followed up her performance in the following year by winning the women's 200 m breaststroke crown at the 2007 Summer Universiade in Bangkok, Thailand. Jung's new meet record of 2:24.67 also dipped beneath the FINA A-cut (2:28.20) by more than four seconds, which assured her a spot on the South Korean team for Beijing 2008.

After excelling internationally in the 2006 and 2007 season, Jung competed for the South Korean swimming team in a breaststroke double at the 2008 Summer Olympics in Beijing. On the first half of a double, the 100 m breaststroke, Jung charged her way to the runner-up spot behind Italy's Roberta Panara in heat four with a steady 1:09.26, but missed the semifinals by almost a full second with a twenty-third overall placement. In her signature event, the 200 m breaststroke, Jung bounced back from the initial half of her specialty double to successfully grab the eleventh seed for the semifinals (2:25.95), but fell short on a berth for the top eight final by the following morning with a disappointing 2:26.83, matching her prelims position in the process.

References

External links
NBC 2008 Olympics profile

1988 births
Living people
South Korean female breaststroke swimmers
Olympic swimmers of South Korea
Swimmers at the 2002 Asian Games
Swimmers at the 2006 Asian Games
Swimmers at the 2008 Summer Olympics
Asian Games medalists in swimming
Female breaststroke swimmers
Swimmers from Seoul
Asian Games bronze medalists for South Korea
Medalists at the 2006 Asian Games
Universiade medalists in swimming
Universiade gold medalists for South Korea
Medalists at the 2007 Summer Universiade
21st-century South Korean women